Honeywell Primus is a range of Electronic Flight Instrument System (EFIS) glass cockpits manufactured by Honeywell Aerospace.
Each system is composed of multiple display units used as primary flight display and multi-function display.

Primus 1000
Primus 1000 is used on:
 Cessna Citation II
 Cessna Citation V
 Cessna Citation Excel
 Embraer ERJ 145 Family
 Embraer Legacy 600
 Learjet 45

Primus 2000/2000XP
Primus 2000 and Primus 2000XP are used on:
 Bombardier Global Express (2000XP)
 Cessna Citation X
 Dornier 328
 Falcon 900

Primus Elite
Primus Elite is an upgrade to older SPZ-8000 series and Primus 1000 and 2000/2000XP flight decks. The upgrade includes replacing the cathode ray tube (CRT) display with new lightweight liquid-crystal displays (LCD). The Primus Elite displays also include enhanced capability of SVS (Synthetic vision system), Jeppesen Charts, Enhanced with XM weather, airports, Navaids, TAF, METARs, Geopolitical boundary, Airways, Airspace information, NOTAMs and many more features. The multi-function display will have cursor control device (CCD) to select the various above listed options.

Primus Apex
Primus Apex is based on the Primus Epic and is designed for single-pilot turboprop aircraft and very light jets.

It is installed in:
 Pilatus PC-12 NG
 Viking Air DHC-6 Twin Otter Series 400

Primus Epic/Epic 2
Primus Epic and Primus Epic 2 are designed for two-crew business or regional jets.

They are used on:
Cessna Citation Sovereign
 Dassault Falcon 7X
 Embraer E-Jet family
 Embraer E-Jet E2 family (Epic 2)
 Gulfstream G350/G450
 Gulfstream G500/G550
 Gulfstream G650/G650ER
 Hawker 4000
 Pilatus PC-24 (Epic 2)
While primarily designed for jet aircraft, the Epic cockpit is also used on the AgustaWestland AW139 medium helicopter, which is certified for single-pilot IFR operations.

Dassault's Enhanced Avionics System (EASy) was jointly developed with Honeywell and is based on the Primus Epic.

Gulfstream Aerospace's PlaneView cockpit is also based on the Primus Epic.

Competition
Primus Apex flight deck competes with Garmin G1000 and G3000 and Avidyne Entegra while Primus Epic competes with Rockwell Collins Pro Line and Garmin G3000 and G5000 on larger aircraft.

References

External links 
 Honeywell Primus Flight Decks
 Primus Epic

Aircraft instruments
Avionics
Glass cockpit